Sergei Viktorovich Slepov (born 19 May 1999) is a Russian football player who plays for Naftan Novopolotsk.

Club career
He made his debut in the Russian Premier League for FC Dynamo Moscow on 10 August 2020 in a game against FC Ural Yekaterinburg, he substituted Clinton N'Jie in the 89th minute.

On 22 June 2021, he joined FC Rotor Volgograd on loan for the 2021–22 season.

Career statistics

References

External links
 
 
 

1999 births
Sportspeople from Yekaterinburg
Living people
Russian footballers
Russia youth international footballers
Association football defenders
Russian expatriate footballers
Expatriate footballers in Belarus
FC Dynamo Moscow players
FC Dynamo Moscow reserves players
FC Rotor Volgograd players
FC Naftan Novopolotsk players
Russian Premier League players
Russian First League players
Russian Second League players